Lay Down the Law is the debut album by the American glam metal band Keel. It was the only album to feature original drummer Bobby Marks. Also, three songs - "Speed Demon", "Tonight You're Mine", and the Rolling Stones cover "Let's Spend the Night Together" - were re-recorded for their next album The Right to Rock, although the version of "Let's Spend The Night Together" on this album ends with reprises of earlier album tracks, while "Tonight You're Mine" was re-recorded as "You're the Victim (I'm the Crime)" with altered lyrics.

The album was released in November 1984 by Shrapnel Records to rave reviews, despite the band signing to Gold Mountain Records a few months prior. It was not released on CD format until 2008.

Track listing
Side one
"Thunder and Lightning" (Ron Keel) - 3:32
"Lay Down the Law" (R. Keel) - 3:44
"Speed Demon" (R. Keel) - 3:36
"Princess of Illusion" (R. Keel) - 4:04
"Born Ready" (Marc Ferrari) - 3:03

Side two
"Metal Generation" (R. Keel, Kenny Chaisson, Bobby Marks) - 2:59
"Till Hell Freezes Over" (R. Keel, Chaisson, Marks) - 4:25
"Tonight You're Mine" (R. Keel, Chaisson, Marks) - 3:00
"Let's Spend the Night Together" (Mick Jagger, Keith Richards) - 3:45

Personnel
Band members
Ron Keel - vocals, guitar, producer
Marc Ferrari - lead guitar, backing vocals
Bryan Jay - lead guitar, backing vocals
Kenny Chaisson - bass, backing vocals
Bobby Marks - drums, backing vocals

Production
Mike Davis - engineer, mixing
John X – assistant engineer
Mike Varney - executive producer

References

Keel (band) albums
1984 debut albums
Shrapnel Records albums
Albums produced by Mike Varney